

Labor strife and more moving
1972 was tainted by a players' strike over pension and salary arbitration.  The strike erased the first week and a half of the season, and the Leagues decided to just excise the lost portion of the season with no makeups.  As a result, an uneven number of games were cancelled for each team; some as few as six, some as many as nine.  The lack of makeups of those games, even when they affected playoffs, led to the Boston Red Sox losing the American League East by half a game to the Detroit Tigers.

1972 marked the first year for the Texas Rangers, who had moved to Arlington from Washington, D.C. (where they played as the Washington Senators), after the  season.  There would be no baseball in D.C. until  .  The team was one of the worst ever fielded by the franchise, losing 100 games for the first time since .  Manager Ted Williams hated living in the Dallas-Fort Worth area, and resigned at the end of the season.

1972 would mark the Kansas City Royals' final year at Kansas City Municipal Stadium, as the next year they would move to Royals Stadium (later named Kauffman Stadium) at the Truman Sports Complex in suburban Kansas City.

The World Series was won by the Oakland Athletics, the first of three straight behind the bats of Reggie Jackson and Bert Campaneris, and the pitching cadre of Catfish Hunter, Rollie Fingers and Vida Blue.  The year ended on a sad note when Roberto Clemente died in an airplane crash off the coast of San Juan, Puerto Rico, on New Year's Eve, while participating in aid efforts after the 1972 Nicaragua earthquake.

Champions

Major League Baseball

World Series MVP: Gene Tenace
All-Star Game, July 25 at Atlanta–Fulton County Stadium: National League, 4–3 (10 innings); Joe Morgan, MVP

Other champions
Amateur World Series: Cuba
College World Series: USC
Japan Series: Yomiuri Giants over Hankyu Braves (4–1)
Big League World Series: Orlando, Florida
Little League World Series: Taipei, Taiwan
Senior League World Series: Pingtung, Taiwan
Winter Leagues
1972 Caribbean Series: Leones de Ponce
Dominican Republic League: Águilas Cibaeñas
Mexican Pacific League: Algodoneros de Guasave
Puerto Rican League: Leones de Ponce
Venezuelan League: Tigres de Aragua

Awards and honors
Baseball Hall of Fame
Yogi Berra
Josh Gibson
Lefty Gomez
Will Harridge
Sandy Koufax
Buck Leonard
Early Wynn
Ross Youngs
Most Valuable Player
Dick Allen, Chicago White Sox, 1B (AL)
Johnny Bench, Cincinnati Reds, C (NL)
Cy Young Award
Gaylord Perry, Cleveland Indians (AL)
Steve Carlton, Philadelphia Phillies (NL)
Rookie of the Year
Carlton Fisk, Boston Red Sox, C (AL)
Jon Matlack, New York Mets, P (NL)
Gold Glove Award
George Scott (1B) (AL)
Doug Griffin (2B) (AL)
Brooks Robinson (3B) (AL)
Ed Brinkman (SS) (AL)
Ken Berry (OF) (AL)
Paul Blair (OF) (AL)
Bobby Murcer (OF) (AL)
Carlton Fisk (C) (AL)
Jim Kaat (P) (AL)
Wes Parker (1B) (NL)
Félix Millán (2B) (NL)
Doug Rader (3B) (NL)
Larry Bowa (SS) (NL)
César Cedeño (OF) (NL)
Roberto Clemente (OF) (NL)
Willie Davis (OF) (NL)
Johnny Bench (C) (NL)
Bob Gibson (P) (NL)

Statistical leaders

Major league baseball final standings

American League final standings

National League final standings

Events

January–March
January 13 – Bernice Gera wins a discrimination suit against organized baseball, opening the door for her to become the first female umpire in professional baseball.
January 19 – The Baseball Writers' Association of America elects Sandy Koufax, Yogi Berra and Early Wynn to the Baseball Hall of Fame. Koufax makes it in his first try and, at age of 36, is the youngest honoree in history.
January 20 – The Chicago Cubs trade Johnny Callison to the New York Yankees for Jack Aker.
February 8 – Commissioner Bowie Kuhn announces that the Special Committee on the Negro Leagues has selected Josh Gibson and Buck Leonard for the Hall of Fame.
March 16 – Reigning Cy Young and MVP award winner Vida Blue announces his retirement.  It will be a short one as he will join the Oakland Athletics in May.

April–June
April 1 – 13 – The first players' strike in baseball history wipes 6–8 games off the schedule of each MLB team. It is agreed that those games will be canceled (i.e., not even played to resolve pennant races). This results in teams not being scheduled for the same number of games in the 1972 season;  the schedule imbalance would lead to the Detroit Tigers edging the Boston Red Sox by only one-half game to win the American League East Division championship.  The strike results in the team owners adding salary arbitration to the collective bargaining agreement, and increasing pension fund payments.
April 2 – With the sudden death of Gil Hodges, Yogi Berra is named manager of the New York Mets.
April 16 – At Wrigley Field, Burt Hooton of the Chicago Cubs no-hits the Philadelphia Phillies 4–0.
April 21 – At Arlington Stadium, Frank Howard hits the first home run in Texas Rangers history, a solo shot against Clyde Wright of the California Angels.
May 11 – The San Francisco Giants trade Willie Mays to the New York Mets for minor league pitcher Charlie Williams and cash.
May 14 – In front of a Mother's Day crowd of 35,000 in New York's Shea Stadium, Willie Mays makes a triumphant return to New York with the Mets, hitting a game-winning home run against his old teammates (the Giants). He scores in the 1st inning on Rusty Staub's grand slam and his solo homer in the 5th inning snaps a 4–4 tie. The final score: Mets 5, Giants 4.
May 16 – Philadelphia Phillies rookie outfielder Greg Luzinski blasts a 500-foot home run off the Liberty Bell at Philadelphia's Veterans Stadium.
May 28 – The Milwaukee Brewers fire manager Dave Bristol, replacing him with Del Crandall. Coach Roy McMillan takes over until Crandall arrives and guides the team to a 4–1 loss to the Boston Red Sox.
June 18 – The U.S. Supreme Court rules 5–3 in favor of Major League Baseball in the lawsuit brought by Curt Flood, upholding the reserve clause.
June 24 – In the first game of a doubleheader between the visiting Auburn Phillies and Geneva Senators of the Class A New York–Pennsylvania League, Bernice Gera becomes the first woman to umpire a professional baseball game.  She resigns between games after being verbally abused by some spectators and by some involved in the game.

July
July 2 – San Francisco's Willie McCovey hits his 14th career grand slam home run to pace the Giants 9–3 win over the Los Angeles Dodgers. Pitcher Randy Moffitt wins his first major league game and receives a congratulatory telegram from his sister Billie Jean King, who is playing at Wimbledon.
July 4 – For the second time in his career, Tom Seaver of the New York Mets has a no-hitter broken up in the ninth. The bid is foiled in the first game of a doubleheader against the San Diego Padres at Shea Stadium by a Leron Lee single with one out, the only hit Seaver will allow in a 2–0 Met victory.
July 9 – Rich Reese of the Minnesota Twins ties a major league record in hitting his third pinch-hit grand slam home run.
July 11 
 At Oakland, Boston's Marty Pattin has his no-hit bid foiled when Reggie Jackson hits a 1-out single in the 9th inning. Boston wins 4–0.
 Billy Williams of the Chicago Cubs goes 8-for-8 in a doubleheader against the Houston Astros at Wrigley Field, hitting home runs in both games and driving in 4 runs. The Cubs lose the first game 6-5 but win the nightcap 9-5.
 Mickey Stanley hit a crucial 9th inning home run as the Detroit Tigers beat the Texas Rangers 6-5 to stay in the American League East race.
July 14 – In a game between the Detroit Tigers and Kansas City Royals in Kansas City, the Tigers' catcher, Tom Haller, has his older brother Bill Haller right over his shoulder;  the first time brothers have served as catcher and home plate umpire in the same Major League game.  The Royals win 1–0.
July 18 – Against the Philadelphia Phillies at San Diego Stadium, San Diego Padre pitcher Steve Arlin has a no-hitter broken up with two out in the ninth by a Denny Doyle single. With two strikes on him, Doyle takes advantage of Padre manager Don Zimmer's decision to play third baseman Dave Roberts in by slapping a ground ball that bounces over Roberts' head—a ball that Roberts could have fielded at normal depth. Doyle later advances to second on a balk, then scores on a Tommy Hutton single. Arlin then retires Greg Luzinski on a fly ball to come away with a two-hitter (one of three he pitches on the season; he also hurls two one-hitters during a season in which he finishes 10–21) in a 5–1 Padre victory. This will be the closest any Padre comes to a no-hitter until Joe Musgrove finally pitches the franchise's first, doing so on April 8, .
July 24 – Leo Durocher steps down as manager of the Chicago Cubs and is replaced by Whitey Lockman.
July 25 – At Atlanta Stadium, the National League wins the All-Star Game over the American League 4–3, behind hometown hero Hank Aaron's two-run home run and Joe Morgan's 10th-inning RBI single. Morgan is named MVP. It is the seventh time the classic has gone into extra innings.
July 31 – Minnesota Twins hurler Bert Blyleven gives up two inside-the-park home runs to Dick Allen of the Chicago White Sox. The next time this feat occurs in the major leagues, Blyleven is again on the mound—watching teammate Greg Gagne circling the bases twice on October 4, 1986.

August-September
August 1 – At Atlanta–Fulton County Stadium, Nate Colbert of the San Diego Padres ties Stan Musial's 18-year record by hitting five home runs in a doubleheader against the Atlanta Braves. He hits two in the first game, won by the Padres 9–0, and three more in the nightcap, which San Diego also wins, 11–7. Musial had hit five home runs in a May 2,  doubleheader—with Colbert, then eight years old, in attendance.
August 17 - Steve Carlton of the Philadelphia Phillies won his 15th consecutive game with a 9-4 victory over the Cincinnati Reds.
August 29 – Jim Barr of the San Francisco Giants retires the first twenty batters in today's game.  Added to the last twenty one batters he retired in his previous game, it establishes a record for consecutive batters retired.  It will be tied in 2007 by relief pitcher Bobby Jenks.
September 2 – At Wrigley Field, Chicago Cub pitcher Milt Pappas no-hits the San Diego Padres 8–0. Pappas retires the first 26 batters and comes to within one strike of a perfect game with a 2–2 count to pinch-hitter Larry Stahl, but home-plate umpire Bruce Froemming calls the next two pitches, both of which are close, balls. Undeterred, Pappas ends the game by retiring the next batter, ex-Cub Garry Jestadt. The perfect game bid is also the only one, to date, to be broken up on a walk to the 27th batter.
September 8 – Ferguson Jenkins wins his 20th game for the 6th straight year in a 4–3 win over the Philadelphia Phillies in Philadelphia.
September 15 – Steve Carlton beats the Montreal Expos 5–3, raising his record to 24–9. The rest of the Philadelphia Phillies pitchers have a combined record of 26–80.
September 20 – Milt Pappas wins his 200th game as a major leaguer, defeating the Montreal Expos 6–2 at Wrigley Field.
September 21 – The Pittsburgh Pirates clinch the National League East title with a 6–2 victory over the Mets.
September 22 – The Cincinnati Reds clinch the National League West crown with a 4–3 road victory over the Houston Astros.
September 30 – During the Pirates' 5–0 win over the Mets at Pittsburgh's Three Rivers Stadium, Roberto Clemente hits a double off New York's Jon Matlack in the 4th inning to get his 3,000th and final regular season hit in the major leagues.

October–December
October 2 – In the first game of a doubleheader at Jarry Park, Bill Stoneman of the Montreal Expos no-hits the New York Mets 7–0. The no-hitter is 1) the second of Stoneman's career (the first having come on April 17, —only nine games into the Expos' existence), 2) the first no-hitter ever pitched in a regular season game in Canada, and 3) the latest, calendar-wise, that a regular-season no-hitter has been pitched, tied with Addie Joss' perfect game in 1908.
October 3 – The Detroit Tigers clinch the American League East as Woodie Fryman beats Luis Tiant of the Boston Red Sox 3–1 for his 10th win. Detroit's Chuck Seelbach picks up his 14th save and Al Kaline singles in the winning run for Detroit.
October 8 – The Oakland Athletics won Game 2 of the 1972 American League Championship Series 5–0 over the Detroit Tigers. A key moment from that game occurred when Oakland's Bert Campaneris who was having a great series hurled his bat at Detroit Tiger pitcher Lerrin LaGrow. Campaneris was fined and suspended for the rest of the series.
October 11 – The Pittsburgh Pirates carry a lead into the bottom of the ninth of the final game of the NLCS.  The Reds' Johnny Bench homers to tie the game.  After some runners reach base, the Pirates' pitcher, Bob Moose, unleashes a wild pitch, permitting the pennant clinching run to score.
October 22 – The Oakland Athletics win the World Series with a 3–2 victory in Game Seven over the Cincinnati Reds. Gene Tenace, who had only five home runs in the regular season, hit four in the Series and is named MVP.
November 8 – The St. Louis Cardinals bring Tim McCarver back to St. Louis, sending Jorge Roque to the Montreal Expos in exchange.
November 22 – Future Hall of Fame catcher Johnny Bench of the Cincinnati Reds wins his second National League MVP Award in three years. Bench beats out Chicago Cubs outfielder Billy Williams, who also ran second to Bench in the 1970 MVP balloting.
November 25 – Pittsburgh Pirates outfielder Roberto Clemente wins his 12th consecutive Gold Glove Award and Los Angeles Dodgers first baseman Wes Parker his sixth in a row. Neither will play in 1973.
November 27 – In a great trade for New York, the Cleveland Indians swap third baseman Graig Nettles and catcher Jerry Moses to the New York Yankees for catcher John Ellis, infielder Jerry Kenney, and outfielders Charlie Spikes and Rusty Torres.
November 28 – In a blockbuster intrastate trade satisfactory for both teams, the Los Angeles Dodgers send Frank Robinson, Bill Singer, Mike Strahler, Bobby Valentine and Billy Grabarkewitz to the California Angels in exchange for Andy Messersmith and Ken McMullen. In 1973, Robinson will hit .266 with 30 home runs with 97 RBI in 147 games, and Singer will combine with Nolan Ryan to strike out 674 batters, to set a 20th-century major league record for two pitching teammates. Messersmith will win 39 games in the next two seasons for the Dodgers and finish second in the 1974 Cy Young Award voting.
December 10 – The American League votes unanimously to adopt the designated hitter rule on a three-year experimental basis. The DH will replace the pitcher in the lineup unless otherwise noted before the start of the game. In the December 1975 meeting, the AL will vote to permanently adopt the DH. The National League declines to follow suit.
December 31 – Roberto Clemente and 4 other people die in a plane crash off the coast of Puerto Rico en route to delivering relief supplies to earthquake victims in Nicaragua.

Births

January

January 1 – Rafael Roque
January 2 – Garrett Stephenson
January 9 – Jay Powell
January 11 – Jermaine Allensworth
January 12 – Rich Loiselle
January 13 – Akinori Otsuka
January 17 – Walt McKeel
January 18 – Keith Glauber
January 18 – Mike Lieberthal
January 20 – Matt Beech
January 20 – Tim Kubinski
January 21 – Alan Benes
January 25 – José Macías
January 27 – Greg Martinez
January 28 – Steve Falteisek
January 28 – Chris Peters
January 28 – Tsuyoshi Shinjo
January 28 – Bryan Ward
January 29 – Morgan Burkhart
January 29 – Julio Mosquera

February
February 1 – Rich Becker
February 2 – Jared Fernandez
February 2 – Melvin Mora
February 11 – Brian Daubach
February 20 – Shane Spencer
February 22 – John Halama
February 23 – Rondell White

March
March 1 – Omar Daal
March 1 – Jimmy Hurst
March 3 – Mike Romano
March 4 – Bruce Aven
March 4 – Mark Wegner
March 10 – Rob Stanifer
March 11 – Salomón Torres
March 12 – George Arias
March 20 – Jason McDonald
March 22 – Cory Lidle
March 24 – José Cabrera
March 24 – Steve Karsay
March 25 – Howard Battle
March 26 – Jason Maxwell
March 27 – Creighton Gubanich
March 27 – Adam Melhuse
March 29 – Alex Ochoa
March 30 – Wilson Heredia

April
April 3 – Steve Soderstrom
April 4 – Guillermo Garcia
April 4 – Jeff Sparks
April 4 – Matt Wagner
April 6 – Marty Malloy
April 10 – Shayne Bennett
April 11 – Robin Jennings
April 11 – Bobby M. Jones
April 11 – Jason Varitek
April 12 – Paul Lo Duca
April 12 – Alfonso Márquez
April 14 – Roberto Mejía
April 15 – Ricky Otero
April 16 – Antonio Alfonseca
April 17 – Gary Bennett
April 21 – Keith Williams
April 24 – Chipper Jones
April 25 – Micah Franklin
April 26 – Brian Anderson
April 26 – Francisco Córdova
April 26 – Felipe Lira
April 27 – Chad Zerbe

May
May 1 – Bobby Chouinard
May 1 – Fausto Cruz
May 3 – Darren Dreifort
May 4 – Manny Aybar
May 10 – Marino Santana
May 11 – Cam Cairncross
May 18 – Jaime Bluma
May 18 – Mike Jerzembeck
May 19 – Scott McClain
May 24 – Danny Bautista
May 24 – Gabe González
May 28 – Tilson Brito
May 28 – Joe Rosselli
May 30 – Scott Eyre
May 30 – Manny Ramírez
May 31 – Dave Roberts

June
June 2 – Raúl Ibañez
June 2 – Chance Sanford
June 3 – Bryan Rekar
June 5 – Mike Coolbaugh
June 6 – Tony Graffanino
June 6 – Brooks Kieschnick
June 6 – Jeff Williams
June 13 – Darrell May
June 15 – Tony Clark
June 15 – Ramiro Mendoza
June 15 – Andy Pettitte
June 19 – Kazuhiro Wada
June 20 – Paul Bako
June 20 – Juan Castro
June 22 – Miguel del Toro
June 25 – Carlos Delgado
June 30 – Garret Anderson
June 30 – Jim Stoops

July
July 5 – Bo Porter
July 6 – Greg Norton
July 11 – Mark Little
July 12 – Kelly Wunsch
July 13 – Clint Sodowsky
July 15 – Wilson Delgado
July 16 – Robbie Beckett
July 19 – Brian Smith
July 21 – Kimera Bartee
July 24 – Shawn Wooten

August
August 1 – Freddy García
August 3 – Wendell Magee
August 4 – Steve Bourgeois
August 5 – John Wasdin
August 6 – Duane Singleton
August 7 – Kerry Lacy
August 9 – Dusty Allen
August 9 – Jeff Zimmerman
August 11 – Andrew Lorraine
August 14 – David Manning
August 15 – Chris Singleton
August 17 – Jeff Abbott
August 19 – Jed Hansen
August 20 – Mike Porzio
August 21 – Dean Crow
August 22 – Steve Kline
August 23 – Raul Casanova
August 24 – Mike Grzanich
August 24 – Kurt Miller
August 24 – Chris Prieto
August 25 – Andy Abad
August 25 – Mike Welch
August 28 – Jay Witasick
August 30 – José Herrera

September
September 1 – Kevin Orie
September 2 – Pat Watkins
September 4 – Darrell Einertson
September 5 – Jimmy Haynes
September 7 – Jason Isringhausen
September 7 – Willie Morales
September 9 – Mike Hampton
September 9 – Félix Rodríguez
September 13 – Nelson Cruz
September 13 – Chan Perry
September 14 – David Bell
September 16 – Brian Tollberg
September 17 – Brady Raggio
September 21 – Scott Spiezio
September 21 – Shannon Withem
September 23 – Pep Harris
September 26 – Fumiya Nishiguchi
September 30 – Curtis Goodwin
September 30 – José Lima

October
October 2 – Rafael Carmona
October 2 – Trey Moore
October 4 – Adam Riggs
October 5 – Yamil Benítez
October 5 – Aaron Guiel
October 6 – Valerio de los Santos
October 6 – Benji Gil
October 8 – Willie Adams
October 9 – Steve Gibralter
October 10 – Mike Holtz
October 10 – Ramón Martínez
October 19 – Keith Foulke
October 19 – Joe McEwing
October 19 – Marc Newfield
October 23 – Giomar Guevara
October 26 – Armando Almanza
October 27 – Brad Radke
October 29 – Richie Barker
October 31 – Chris Clemons

November
November 2 – Travis Miller
November 3 – Armando Benítez
November 6 – Deivi Cruz
November 6 – Matt Skrmetta
November 7 – Travis Smith
November 10 – Shawn Green
November 10 – Greg LaRocca
November 11 – Danny Rios
November 12 – Homer Bush
November 15 – Darwin Cubillán
November 22 – Luis Andújar
November 22 – Jay Payton
November 25 – Ramón Fermín
November 28 – Geraldo Guzmán
November 28 – José Parra

December
December 5 – Cliff Floyd
December 5 – Mike Mahoney
December 6 – Rick Short
December 6 – Neil Weber
December 7 – Chris Dale
December 8 – Jolbert Cabrera
December 11 – Frank Rodriguez
December 14 – Marcus Jensen
December 16 – Charles Gipson
December 18 – Chris Seelbach
December 21 – LaTroy Hawkins
December 21 – Dustin Hermanson
December 25 – Erik Hiljus
December 27 – Mike Busby
December 28 – Einar Díaz
December 29 – Jim Brower

Deaths

January
January 2 – Glenn Crawford, 58, outfielder for the St. Louis Cardinals and Philadelphia Phillies in the 1940s.
January 15 – William Benswanger, 79, executive; son-in-law of Barney Dreyfuss who served as president and chief executive of the Pittsburgh Pirates from 1932 until the Dreyfuss family sold the team in August 1946.
January 19 – Joe Goodrich, 78, third baseman who played for the Washington Potomacs of the Eastern Colored League in 1923 and 1924.
January 21 – Dick Loftus, 70, outfielder for the Brooklyn Robins from 1924–1925, playing in 97 total games.
January 23 – Fred Nicholson, 77, outfielder/pinch hitter who batted .311 over 303 career games for the 1917 Detroit Tigers, 1919–1920 Pittsburgh Pirates and 1921–1922 Boston Braves.

February
February 2 – Dick Burrus, 74, first baseman and .291 lifetime hitter who played in 560 games for the 1919–1920 Philadelphia Athletics and 1925–1928 Boston Braves; made 200 hits in 1925.
February 4 – Joe Green, 74, pinch hitter who had a single professional at bat for the Philadelphia Athletics, on July 2, 1924.
February 6 – Frankie Zak, 49, shortstop and second baseman who played only 123 MLB games for wartime Pittsburgh Pirates (1944–1946), yet was selected to 1944 National League All-Star team.
February 9 – Chico Ruiz, 33, utility infielder who played in 565 games between 1964 and 1971 for the Cincinnati Reds and California Angels; on Kansas City Royals' winter roster at the time of his death.
February 12 – Jim Sullivan, 77, pitcher who hurled in 25 games for the Philadelphia Athletics (1921–1922) and Cleveland Indians (1923).
February 15 – Pep Goodwin, 80, infielder for the 1914–1915 Kansas City Packers of the "outlaw" Federal League; served as president of the Pacific Coast League in 1955.
February 17 – Lew Malone, 74, infielder in 133 games for the Philadelphia Athletics (1915–1916) and Brooklyn Robins (1917, 1919).
February 22 – Johnnie Oden, 69, third baseman who played from 1927 through 1932, chiefly with the Birmingham Black Barons of the Negro National League.
February 28 – Dizzy Trout, 56, two-time All-Star pitcher for the Detroit Tigers (1939–1952) who led the AL in wins in 1943 and was MVP runnerup the following year; also pitched briefly for Boston Red Sox and Baltimore Orioles, and was a member of the Tigers' broadcasting team.

March
March 4 – Watty Clark, 69, left-handed hurler who won 111 games over a dozen seasons between 1924 and 1937 for three MLB clubs, most notably the Brooklyn Robins and Dodgers; led National League pitchers in games lost (19) in 1929 but went 20–12 (3.49) for a first-division 1932 Brooklyn club.
March 6 – Stan Jok, 45, third baseman and pinch hitter in 12 games for the 1954 Philadelphia Phillies and 1954–1955 Chicago White Sox.
March 10 – George Cunningham, 77, pitcher/outfielder who appeared in 162 career games, 123 of them on the mound, for the 1916–1919 Detroit Tigers.
March 11 – Zack Wheat, 83, Hall of Fame left fielder who played 18 National League seasons (1909–1926) for Brooklyn; held the franchise's career records for games (2,322), hits (2,804), doubles (464) and triples (171); a lifetime .317 hitter who retired with the tenth-most hits in history; member of 1916 and 1920 NL champion Robins.
March 12 – Dutch Levsen, 73, pitcher whose mediocre six-season career with 1923–1928 Cleveland Indians included one standout campaign: 1926, when he went 16–13 with 18 complete games.
March 16 – Pie Traynor, 72, Hall of Fame third baseman for the Pittsburgh Pirates (1920–1935, 1937) who batted .320 lifetime and established a record for career games at third base; was named the best ever at his position in 1969; managed Pirates from June 19, 1934 through 1939.
March 18 – Frank Bushey, 65, Boston Red Sox pitcher who worked in 12 career games during the 1927 and 1930 seasons.
March 19 – Gordie Hinkle, 66, catcher who appeared in 27 games for the 1934 Red Sox; bullpen coach for the 1939 Detroit Tigers.
March 24 – Dick Coffman, 65, pitcher who toiled in 472 games over 15 seasons between 1927 and 1945 for the Washington Senators, St. Louis Browns, New York Giants, Boston Bees and Philadelphia Phillies; with Giants, he became a relief pitcher who led the National League in games pitched (51) and saves (12) in 1938.
March 28 – Donie Bush, 84, shortstop of the Detroit Tigers for 14 seasons who led the American League in walks five times and was a superlative bunter; later managed Pittsburgh to the 1927 National League pennant; also skippered three other MLB clubs between 1923 and 1933, and became prominent as a minor league manager and executive.
March 28 – Cy Moore, 67, pitcher who worked in 147 National League games between 1929 and 1934 for Brooklyn and Philadelphia.
March 30 – Davy Jones, 91, outfielder with the Detroit Tigers who organized a 1912 walkout to protest Ty Cobb's suspension for attacking a heckler.

April
April 2 – Gil Hodges, 47, Baseball Hall of Fame, eight-time All-Star and three-time Gold Glove first baseman for the Brooklyn and Los Angeles Dodgers (1943 and 1947–1961); member of 1955 and 1959 world champions; drove in more runs than any other player during the 1950s; finished playing career with expansion New York Mets (1962–1963) and served as third full-time manager in the team's annals from 1968 until his death, leading the "Miracle Mets" to the 1969 World Series title; also managed the Washington Senators from May 23, 1963 through 1967.
April 3 – Alvin Crowder, 73, pitcher who had three 20-win seasons with the Senators, winning 26 and 24 games (in 1932–1933) and St. Louis Browns; led American League hurlers in winning percentage in 1928; known for his mastery against the Yankees.
April 7 – Larry Brown, 70, standout Negro leagues catcher, seven-time All-Star, and member of 1927 champion Chicago American Giants; played for five teams over 22 years between 1923 and 1947 and served as player-manager of the American Giants (1935) and Memphis Red Sox (1942–1943, 1945, 1947–1948).
April 8 – Gus Fisher, 86, left-handed-hitting catcher who appeared in 74 games for the 1911 Cleveland Naps and 1912 New York Highlanders of the American League.
April 9 – Roy Leslie, 77, first baseman in 160 career games during one-year stints for the 1917 Chicago Cubs, 1919 St. Louis Cardinals and 1922 Philadelphia Phillies.
April 16 – Lou Perini, 68, construction magnate and club owner (1945–1962) who moved the struggling Braves from his home city of Boston to Milwaukee in March 1953, finding instant success on the field and at the turnstiles and kicking off a two-decade spasm of franchise relocations and expansion in MLB; his Boston and Milwaukee Braves won three NL pennants and the 1957 World Series.
April 22 – Frank Drews, 55, second baseman who appeared in 95 total games for the wartime, 1944–1945 Boston Braves.

May

May 2 – Jack Smith, 76, outfielder who played all or part of 15 National League seasons (1915–1929) for the St. Louis Cardinals and Boston Braves, getting into 1,406 games.
May 4 – Vic Sorrell, 71, pitcher who spent his entire 280-game career with the Detroit Tigers between 1928 and 1937; member of Tigers' 1935 World Series champs and 1934 AL pennant-winners.
May 11 – Lynn King, 64, back-up outfielder who played in 175 games for the St. Louis Cardinals in 1935, 1936 and 1938.
May 11 – Danny Schell, 44, outfielder/pinch hitter who appeared in 94 games for the 1954–1955 Philadelphia Phillies.
May 11 – Suds Sutherland, 78, pitcher, pinch hitter and outfielder in 17 games for 1921 Detroit Tigers; in 13 mound appearances, he posted a 6–2 won–lost record.
May 15 – John Milligan, 68, pitcher who played from 1928 through 1934 for the Philadelphia Phillies and Washington Senators.
May 15 – Dixie Parker, 72, catcher and pinch hitter in four games for the 1923 Phillies.
May 18 – Babe Barna, 57, outfielder who appeared in 207 career games for the Philadelphia Athletics, New York Giants and Boston Red Sox between 1937 and 1943.
May 19 – Felix McLaurin, 50, outfielder who played in the Negro leagues from 1942 to 1946, chiefly for the Birmingham Black Barons and New York Black Yankees.
May 20 – Wally Dashiell, 70, shortstop who played one big-league game, on April 20, 1924, for the Chicago White Sox.
May 20 – Hoge Workman, 72, pitcher for the 1924 Boston Red Sox, who also played and coached for Cleveland teams of the National Football League.
May 22 – Dick Fowler, 51, Canadian pitcher who won 66 games with the Philadelphia Athletics over ten seasons between 1941 and 1952, including a no-hitter on September 9, 1945, at Shibe Park against the St. Louis Browns.
May 24 – Bill Moore, 68, catcher for the 1927 Boston Red Sox.
May 25 – Charlie Henry, 72, pitcher in the Negro leagues between 1924 and 1929.
May 28 – Al Gerheauser, 54, left-handed pitcher who worked in 149 career games for 1943–1944 Philadelphia Phillies, 1945–1946 Pittsburgh Pirates and 1948 St. Louis Browns.
May 28 – Bob Hasty, 76, Philadelphia Athletics pitcher who appeared in 146 in an MLB career that began on September 11, 1919 and ended on September 26, 1924.
May 29 – Moe Berg, 70, catcher who served as a spy for the U.S. government during and after his playing career; played in 663 games for five MLB teams between 1923 and 1939, batting .243 lifetime.

June
June 7 – Topper Rigney, 75, shortstop for the Detroit Tigers, Boston Red Sox and Washington Senators who appeared in 694 games and twice batted over .300.
June 9 – Del Bissonette, 72, first baseman who twice batted .300 for the Brooklyn Robins and hit .305 lifetime in 604 games (1928–1931 and 1933); managed 1945 Boston Braves from July 31 through the end of the season.
June 12 – Lefty Phillips, 53, manager of the California Angels from May 27, 1969, through 1971; previously pitching coach for the Los Angeles Dodgers (1965 to 1968) and a longtime scout.
June 24 – Crush Holloway, 75, outfielder and aggressive, hard-sliding baserunner who played in the Negro leagues between 1921 and 1939, notably for the Baltimore Black Sox and Atlanta Black Crackers.
June 23 – Tom Long, 82, outfielder for the 1911–1912 Washington Senators and 1915–1917 St. Louis Cardinals; led National league in triples with 25 in 1915.
June 26 – Mike Kircher, 74, pitcher who made 14 appearances for the Philadelphia Athletics and St. Louis Cardinals from 1919 to 1921.

July
July 2 – Rankin Johnson Sr., 84, pitcher in 72 total contests for the Boston Red Sox (1914), Chicago and Baltimore of the Federal League (1914 and 1915), and St. Louis Cardinals (1918); his son was an MLB pitcher and minor-league executive.
July 3 – Leroy Herrmann, 66, pitcher who worked in 45 games for the Chicago Cubs (1932–1933 and 1935).
July 11 – Johnnie Tyler, 65, outfielder in 16 career games for the 1934–1935 Boston Braves.
July 17 – Al Spohrer, 68, catcher who played in 756 National League games—two for the 1928 New York Giants and 754 for the 1928–1935 Boston Braves.
July 20 – José María Fernández, 76, Cuban catcher in the Negro leagues whose playing career extended for at least 14 seasons between 1916 and 1947; managed New York Cubans from 1939 to 1948, including 1947 Negro World Series champions.
July 21 – Harry McCurdy, 72, lefty-swinging backup catcher who appeared in 543 over ten seasons between 1922 and 1934 for four MLB clubs, batting .282 lifetime.
July 31 – Rollie Hemsley, 65, catcher who played in 1,593 games for seven MLB teams between 1928 and 1947; five-time American League All-Star; later a coach and minor league manager.

August
August 5 – Red McKee, 82, left-handed-hitting catcher who played in 189 games for the 1913–1916 Detroit Tigers.
August 7 – Red Anderson, 60, pitcher who appeared in 36 games over three seasons for the Washington Senators (1937 and 1940–1941).
August 13 – Herman Besse, 60, southpaw twirler who went 5–15 with an ERA of 6.79 in 65 games for the Philadelphia Athletics (1940–1943, 1946).
August 13 – George Weiss, 78, executive and cornerstone of the New York Yankees dynasty as farm director (1932–1947), then general manager (1947–1960), with the team winning 15 World Series titles over Weiss' 29 years; first team president of expansion New York Mets (1961–1966); named to Baseball Hall of Fame by Veterans Committee in 1971.
August 14 – Bricktop Wright, 63, outfielder/first baseman who played in 22 games for 1943 New York Black Yankees of the Negro National League; played professional basketball in the 1930s and 1940s.
August 15 – Jeff Pfeffer, 84, pitcher and 13-year (1911 and 1913–1924) MLB veteran who worked in 347 games for four teams, principally Brooklyn and St. Louis of the National League, won 158 games, and posted a 2.77 career ERA.
August 16 – Fred Bailey, 77, outfielder and pinch hitter for the 1916–1918 Boston Braves who played in 60 career games.
August 21 – Eddie Kenna, 74, catcher who appeared in 41 games for the 1928 Washington Senators.
August 24 – J. Roy Stockton, 79, St. Louis sportswriter from the 1910s to the 1950s, also a sportscaster and author of books on baseball.
August 25 – Italo Chelini, 57, left-handed pitcher who made 24 appearances for the 1935–1937 Chicago White Sox.
August 25 – Jack Crouch, 68, aptly named catcher who appeared in 43 big-league games for the St. Louis Browns and Cincinnati Reds between 1930 and 1933.
August 26 – "Deacon Danny" MacFayden, 67, pitcher who worked in 465 games over 17 MLB seasons for the Boston Red Sox (1926–1932), New York Yankees (1932–1934), Boston Braves and Bees (1935–1939 and 1943), Pittsburgh Pirates (1940) and Washington Senators (1941); member of 1932 World Series champions.
August 27 – John Barnes, 69, lefty-swinging catcher who played for nine Negro National League teams (in 226 games) between 1922 and 1931.
August 29 – Clem Hausmann, 53, pitcher for the Boston Red Sox and Philadelphia Athletics between 1944 and 1949.
August 30 – Hank Miller, 55, two-time Negro National League All-Star who pitched in 89 games, 88 of them for the Philadelphia Stars, between 1938 and 1948.
August 31 – Ivey Shiver, 65, outfielder who played in 21 MLB games as a member of the 1931 Detroit Tigers and 1934 Cincinnati Reds.

September
September 2 – Jim Brillheart, 68, who pitched in 68 MLB games for the Washington Senators, Chicago Cubs and Boston Red Sox over four seasons between 1922 and 1931; longtime minor-league hurler who played in 29 pro seasons through 1951, and one of the few pitchers in baseball history to appear in over 1,000 career games.
September 3 – Tom Fisher, 91, pitcher who dropped 16 of 22 decisions for the 1904 Boston Beaneaters of the National League.
September 4 – Bob Bowman, 61, pitcher who compiled a 26–17 record and 3.82 ERA in 109 appearances with St. Louis Cardinals (1939–1940), New York Giants (1941) and Chicago Cubs (1942); gained notoriety by beaning newly acquired Joe Medwick of Brooklyn on June 18, 1940, sparking a bench-clearing brawl.
September 6 – Charlie Berry, 69, American League catcher who played in 709 games over 11 seasons between 1925 and 1938; later an AL umpire from 1942 to 1962 who worked in five World Series and five All-Star Games; also played in the NFL and officiated numerous NFL championship games.
September 9 – Will Jackman, 76, pitcher who at age 39 led the 1935 Negro National League in games pitched, complete games, and games lost.
September 16 – Eddie Waitkus, 53, first baseman for the Chicago Cubs, Philadelphia Phillies and Baltimore Orioles who was shot in 1949 by a teenaged female admirer who lured him to her hotel room; after his recovery, was a key member of Phils' 1950 "Whiz Kids" pennant-winner; twice named to NL All-Star team.
September 19 – Les Bartholomew, 69, left-handed pitcher in nine career games for 1928 Pittsburgh Pirates and 1932 Chicago White Sox.
September 25 – Jerry Lynn, 56, second baseman for the 1937 Washington Senators; went two-for-three (.667) in his only big-league game.
September 26 – Jesse Baker, 84, left-hander who worked in 22 games for the 1911 Chicago White Sox.

October
October 9 – Dave Bancroft, 81, Hall of Fame shortstop for four NL teams, known for his defensive skill and also batting over .300 five times; captain of the New York Giants' pennant winners from 1921–1923.
October 11 – Danny Taylor, 71, outfielder who appeared in 674 career games for three MLB clubs, notably Brooklyn, over nine seasons between 1926 and 1936.
October 17 – Johnny Rawlings, 80, shortstop for the  New York Giants World Series champions and later a manager in the All-American Girls Professional Baseball League.
October 19 – Butch Glass, 74, left-handed pitcher and occasional outfielder/first baseman who played for five Negro National League teams from 1923 to 1930.
October 20 – Allen Russell, 72, pitcher in 345 games for the New York Yankees, Boston Red Sox and Washington Senators between 1915 and 1925 who led American League with nine saves in 1923; member of 1924 world champion Senators.
October 22 – Elbert Williams, 65, pitcher who appeared in the Negro leagues between 1929 and 1935.
October 24 – Jackie Robinson, 53, Hall of Fame second baseman for the Brooklyn Dodgers who broke Major League Baseball's color line in 1947 after beginning his professional career for the Kansas City Monarchs of the Negro American League; batted .311 in his ten-year National League career, leading the NL in batting average (.342) in 1949; also led his league in stolen bases in 1947 and 1949; 1947 Major League Rookie of the Year; 1949 NL Most Valuable Player; 1955 World Series champion; seven-time All-Star whose uniform #42 has been retired by every organized baseball team since 1997.
October 25 – Stretch Miller, 62, St. Louis sportscaster who was a member of the Cardinals' radio team from 1950–1954.
October 29 – Dutch Dietz, 60, pitcher in 106 games for Pittsburgh Pirates and Philadelphia Phillies between 1940 and 1943.

November
November 2 – Freddy Parent, 96, shortstop in the Red Sox' first seven seasons, and the last surviving participant of the inaugural 1903 World Series.
November 3 – Phil Voyles, 72, outfielder who appeared in 20 games for the 1929 Boston Braves.
November 6 – Agustín Bejerano, 63, Cuban outfielder in the Negro leagues who played during the 1928 and 1929 seasons.
November 8 – Harry Child, 67, relief pitcher who worked in five games for the 1930 Washington Senators.
November 18 – Matthew Carlisle, 62, second baseman and shortstop who played in 395 Negro leagues games, 365 of them for the Homestead Grays; member of the 1943 Negro World Series champions.
November 26 – George Jackson, 90, outfielder who appeared in 152 games from 1911 to 1913 as a member of the Boston Rustlers/Braves of the National League.
November 26 – Wendell Smith, 58, sportswriter for Pittsburgh and Chicago newspapers since 1937 who became the BBWAA's first black member and helped ease Jackie Robinson's entry into the major leagues; also a Chicago sportscaster since 1964.
November 29 – Bernie Neis, 77, switch-hitting outfielder who played 677 career games for the Brooklyn Robins, Boston Braves, Cleveland Indians and Chicago White Sox between 1920 and 1927.

December
December 2 – Rip Conway, 76, second baseman who appeared in 14 contests for the 1918 Boston Braves.
December 4 – John Henry Russell, 74, All-Star second baseman in the Negro leagues who played between 1924 and 1934, chiefly for the St. Louis Stars and Memphis Red Sox.
December 12 – Frog Holsey, 66, Negro leagues pitcher between 1928 and 1932, principally for the Chicago American Giants.
December 17 – Fred Bankhead, 60, second baseman who played in 243 games over 12 seasons (1937–1948) for three Negro leagues teams, chiefly the Memphis Red Sox.
December 20 – Gabby Hartnett, 72, Hall of Fame catcher for the Chicago Cubs (1922–1940) who virtually clinched the 1938 pennant with a home run, he established career records for games and home runs as a catcher and was the NL's 1935 MVP; player-manager of Cubs from July 21, 1938 through 1940.
December 23 – Dutch Jordan, 92, second baseman for the 1903–1904 Brooklyn Superbas.
December 28 – Eddie Leishman, 62, longtime minor-league executive who served as first general manager of expansion San Diego Padres of the National League from 1968 until his death.
December 30 – Pee Wee Butts, 53, five-time All-Star shortstop who played in the Negro leagues from 1938–1942 and 1944–1948, primarily for the Baltimore Elite Giants.
December 31 – Roberto Clemente, 38, right fielder for the Pittsburgh Pirates since 1955; a lifetime .317 hitter, 12-time All-Star and winner of 12 Gold Gloves who was a four-time batting champion and the NL's 1966 MVP, he collected his 3,000th base hit in September; two-time (1960, 1971) World Series champion and 1971 World Series MVP; elected to Baseball Hall of Fame within weeks of his death.

References